Juan Apóstol, el más amado is an 2016 Mexican film produced by Beverly Hills Entertainment who previously produced the film Santiago Apóstol, and also is based on the life of John the Apostle, one of the most outstanding disciples of Jesus of Nazareth. The film stars Mané de la Parra as John the Apostle, Marjorie de Sousa as Mary Magdalene, and Livia Brito as Mary, mother of Jesus.

Cast 
 Mané de la Parra as John the Apostle
 Marjorie de Sousa as Mary Magdalene
 Livia Brito as Mary, mother of Jesus
 Alicia Machado
 Cristian Rivero
 Sissi Fleitas es Santa María Salomé
 Boris Izaguirre es Pontius Pilate

References

External links 
 

2019 films
2019 television films
Mexican historical drama films